Homestuck is a webcomic written, illustrated, and animated by Andrew Hussie as part of MS Paint Adventures (MSPA). The webcomic centers on a group of teenagers who unwittingly bring about the end of the world through the installation of a beta copy of an upcoming computer game. Homestuck features a complex story and a large cast of characters, starring the four children John Egbert, Rose Lalonde, Dave Strider, and Jade Harley. Hussie invented an alien species, called trolls, that have a unique culture. Homestuck characters are particularly popular to cosplay at anime conventions.

According to Lauren Rae Orsini writing for The Daily Dot, there existed 128 named characters in Homestuck in September 2012, with more still being introduced. The cast of Homestuck features a large quantity of LGBT characters, and a major theme of the webcomic is the multitude of characters that die throughout the story.

Kids

Beta kids

The first few acts of Homestuck center around four 13-year-old children. Early pages of Homestuck were experiments in "fan-sourced storytelling", where Hussie allowed readers of Homestuck to name its characters and make story suggestions. The main characters of Homestuck were all named by fans. The four main characters are presented as Internet friends who have technically never met one another, but interact through an online chat application.

John Egbert is the main protagonist of Homestuck and the first character that is introduced. He is portrayed as a loyal "leader" of the group of kids, despite also being described as a "stereotypical mischief-making teen." Jokingly described by blogger Subdee as a "shoujo [sic] heroine", John's character is notably fond of bad films and has a seemingly irrational revulsion to the Betty Crocker brand. His weapon of choice is a hammer (strife specibus Hammerkind). His classpect is Heir of Breath.

Rose Lalonde is portrayed as an "intellectual", both through her obsession with Lovecraftian literature and through her organizing and planning the group's movement during the story. She tends to speak and write in a formal, overwrought manner, as if to demonstrate her knowledge. Aside from her interest in the occult, the character also enjoys knitting and uses her knitting needles as her go-to weapons (strife specibus Needlekind). Rose forms a relationship with, and marries in Act 7, the troll Kanaya Maryam during the events of Homestuck. Her classpect is Seer of Light.

Dave Strider is a boy "so cool he only appreciates things ironically." He copied this behavior from his older brother (also his biological father through ectobiology and his only guardian), who collects puppets and katanas on what Dave assumes is an ironic level. Dave has been described as "smart-cynical," and is John's best friend. Surrounded by bad video games and junk food, he wears aviator sunglasses, obscuring his eyes entirely, and wields katana in combat situations. He wields a sword (using the strife specibus Bladekind). His classpect is Knight of Time.

Dave is the fictional creator of Hussie's spin-off webcomic Sweet Bro and Hella Jeff, in-jokes of which are featured frequently in Homestuck. Sweet Bro and Hella Jeff are intentionally poorly made, featuring unsteady lines, liberal use of the spray paint tool, heavy jpeg artification, and the unpopular typeface Comic Sans.

First shown on-screen during Homestucks third act, Shaenon Garrity described Jade as "the most recalcitrant" of the four kids. Jade Harley lives on a remote island together with her dog, Becquerel, who is the First Guardian of Earth (later merging with him). As she can see the future through her dreams, Jade was the one who encouraged the other three kids to play the fictional video game Sburb, and therefore set the plot in motion. She often uses a hunting rifle (specibus Riflekind) in battle. Her classpect is Witch of Space, and being a space player, she creates the Genesis Frog of her session.

Alpha kids

Jane Crocker is the heiress to the Betty Crocker fortune, and she is the symbolic leader of the four alpha kids. She wields a weapon similar to a pitchfork that vacillates between a pronged or spoon-like head depending on the Betty Crocker branding at the time (strife specibus Forkkind or Spoonkind). Crocker's classpect is the Maid of Life.

One of the last two humans on a future post-apocalyptic Earth (along with Dirk Strider), Roxy Lalonde lives by herself and is known to frequently drink. Her classpect is the Rogue of Void.

Dirk Strider is the brother to Dave Strider who shares a similar affinity for irony. At a young age, he made a digital copy of his brain that became his self-aware chat auto-responder. Strider's classpect is Prince of Heart.

Similar to Jade Harley, Jake English lives alone on an island. He is a fan of action movies and speaks in an antiquated fashion. English's surname comes from the villain Lord English. His classpect is Page of Hope.

Trolls  

In the fifth "act" of Homestuck, Hussie introduced an alien species called "trolls", based on Internet trolls, who live on the planet of Alternia in another universe. While the first few acts of Homestuck focused on a more realistic theme of what it is like for a group of kids to be friends on the Internet, the trolls took on more explicit representations of facets of Internet culture. Hussie stated that each troll represents a kind of Internet behavior that is "marginalized or controversial, or something most people just want nothing to do with." Homestuck aims to normalize and humanize internet cultures that are usually disfavored and rejected.

Trolls chat with unique typing quirks, inserting clues concerning the speaker's identity in their chat patterns. For example, Vriska, a troll with spider-like attributes, replaces the letter 'B' with the number '8' and uses emoticons with eight eyes. Troll culture features a complex system of romance, featuring four "quadrants", that was specifically designed to encourage shipping among Homestuck fans. Homestuck trolls are by default bi- or pansexual; this normalization has been described by a fan as "incredible for all the bi and gay kids out there... seeing loads of couples that don't think twice about how they're dating somebody of the same gender of themselves."

With few exceptions, all trolls fall on the hemospectrum, a caste system dictated by blood color and its corresponding attributes, such as lifespan, powers, personality, and rarity. Where burgundy-blooded trolls are common and fall at the bottom of the social hierarchy, fuchsia blood is exceptionally rare, and its carriers sit at the top of the hierarchy. Each troll also has an astrological sign, which carries their blood color and reflects their personality.

The names of the twelve trolls (all of which have twelve letters, divided equally into six-lettered names and six-lettered surnames) were also suggested by Homestuck readers, but they were the last instance of user input, as Homestucks readership had expanded significantly at this point. In an interview with Comics Alliance, Hussie remembered how "the moment it went crazy was really unmistakable ... it was when I brought the trolls into the picture," saying that Homestuck became a "contagious phenomenon" about halfway through the sub-arc introducing the characters.

A powerful psychic with an ability to speak with the dead, Aradia is responsible for recovering the code for Sgrub, the troll version of Sburb, from some ruins. She is a burgundy-blood: the lowest ranking blood color on the hemospectrum with the shortest lifespan of all trolls, but also the most likely to have psychic powers. One night, before entering Sgrub, an incident occurs which kills her lusus (caretaker); eventually it is revealed that this also killed Aradia, turning her into a ghost and causing her to lose interest in everything she enjoyed prior, including archaeology, and focus instead on acquiring and playing Sgrub. At Vriska's suggestion, Equius creates a robot body for Aradia which she inhabits for a large part of the comic. After her robot body explodes, she is one of the only trolls to go god-tier. Her astrological sign is Aries. Her classpect is Maid of Time.

Tavros is a bronze-blood who deals with self-esteem issues throughout his character arc. He is shy and unassertive, and struggles with standing up for himself, especially to Vriska. He is shown to have an interest in fairy tales and fantasy stories, notably Pupa Pan, the Alternian equivalent of Peter Pan, and also has the ability to commune with animals. He uses a wheelchair after an encounter with Vriska, who has an unrequited crush on him, left him paralyzed, but he later gets robotic legs (although Vriska kills him directly afterwards). His astrological sign is Taurus. Tavros' ancestral figure, Rufioh, was inspired by the character Rufio from the 1991 film Hook. Dante Basco, who played Rufio in Hook, started reading Homestuck because his character made an appearance in it, and he later stated that Tavros is his favorite Homestuck character because of his relation to Rufioh. His classpect is Page of Breath.

Sollux is a computer programmer whose personality is associated with ideas of duality. Sollux is a gold-blood, a caste known for great psychic power. He is the one who programs Sgrub (the troll version of Sburb) from the code Aradia found. Sollux has the ability to talk to the recently deceased, who inform him that Alternia will be annihilated. He also claims that he is destined to go blind before dying, a claim which later proves to be partially true. Sollux speaks with a severe lisp, and his typing quirk reflects this. He frequently calls his friends by two-letter abbreviations of their names (e.g. Karkat becomes KK, Terezi becomes TZ, etc.) His introduction mirrors Dave's, his astrological sign is Gemini, and his classpect is Mage of Doom. The name Sollux Captor is a reference to the brightest two stars in Gemini, Pollux and Castor.

Karkat is the de facto leader of the trolls' group, and his introduction in Act 5 mirrors that of John at the start of the webcomic. He is quick to anger, loud, and often rude, but has a strong sense of justice, and is good at heart. His blood color is candy-red, which is considered a mutant color outside the hemospectrum, giving him an unshakable fear of persecution, causing him to be self-conscious and leading him to use a dull gray as not to reveal his true blood color. His astrological sign is Cancer. The name Karkat is a reference to "Karkata" the name of Cancer in the Hindu zodiac. It may also be a reference to the Hindi word  meaning waste, a reference to his blood color. His classpect is Knight of Blood.

Nepeta is an olive-blood, considered the "middle class" of the hemospectrum. She lives in a cave with her lusus, and is known for acting like a cat. She embodies an interest in both furries and shipping, a combination Hussie described as "for the sake of efficiency." She is Equius' moirail, or pacifying platonic soulmate, and has a crush on Karkat. Her astrological sign is Leo. The name Nepeta is a reference to the Genus name for the plant Catnip. In many North Germanic languages,  translates to Lion. Her classpect is Rogue of Heart.

Kanaya is a jade-blood. She has a great interest in fashion, and is thematically strongly influenced by the Virgin Mary, taking on a motherly role towards the other trolls, particularly Karkat. Over the course of the story, she eventually becomes a so-called "rainbow drinker", or vampire. Kanaya's romantic relationship with Rose Lalonde is one of the most popular canon same-sex relationships in the webcomic, commonly referred to as "Rosemary." Her astrological sign is Virgo. The name Kanaya is a reference to "Kanya" the name of Virgo in the Hindu zodiac. Maryam is a reference to the Arabic form of Mary. Her classpect is Sylph of Space and, being the space player, she creates the genesis frog of her session.

Terezi is the troll who guides Dave through the earlier acts of Homestuck. She is blind and able to visualize the world through her sense of smell and taste. She is teal-blooded and portrayed as an avid role-player and has a strong sense of justice. Her astrological sign is Libra. The name Terezi is a reference to the Albanian word , meaning "Justice." Terezi was the first of three Homestuck characters to be introduced in Namco Bandai's dating simulator Namco High, of which Andrew Hussie was the creative director. Her classpect is Seer of Mind.

Vriska is cerulean-blooded and takes the role of an antihero in Homestuck. Being raised by a giant spider, Vriska uses a spider-themed typing quirk and aspires to be a pirate. Her weapon is a set of legendary eight-sided dice, which, depending on what they roll, can cause devastating attacks. Her astrological sign is Scorpio. The character is described as "ruthless, manipulative [and] powerful", and was considered among the "most hardcore" eyepatch-wearing fictional characters by The Mary Sue. Her classpect is Thief of Light.

Equius is presented as an indigo-blooded robotics expert with an unnatural amount of strength. Despite his thorough belief in the hemospectrum, he has a borderline fetishistic adoration for Aradia Megido, who is of the lowest caste. He is Nepeta's moirail, a companion who is seen as a platonic soulmate and helps pacify their more aggressive tendencies. His astrological sign is Sagittarius. His classpect is Heir of Void.

Gamzee is a purple-blooded troll with strong ties to his religious faith, referred to as the "Cult of the Mirthful Messiahs". This religion is similar to that of the juggalo: he has an obsession with Faygo and believes firmly in miracles and the coming of the Dark Carnival. He is often high on Sopor Slime or possessed by other forces such as Lord English or his classpect. He is good friends with Karkat and Tavros and asks Tavros out once, but the page cuts off before Tavros could give a definitive answer. His astrological sign is Capricorn. His classpect is Bard of Rage.

Eridan is shown as an aristocrat with a genocidal superiority complex. He claims he has a strong desire to kill all land-dwelling trolls and had commissioned a doomsday device from Vriska to that effect, but he never acts on any of this. He was obsessive over his former moirail Feferi which led to a toxic relationship, and when she couldn't handle keeping his anger in check and left him, he became so enraged that he killed both her and Kanaya (who tried to stop him), as well as almost killing Sollux. He is a violet-blood, making him part of the two castes that make up the sea-dwellers, a sub-race of trolls "distinct from the commoners by mutation and habitat", as it is put during his introduction. His astrological sign is Aquarius. The name Eridan is a reference to Eridanus, the river of life in Ancient Greek mythology. His classpect is Prince of Hope.

Feferi is a sea-dweller like Eridan, as well as his former moirail. Feferi is the heir apparent for Alternian rulership, which puts her at risk from Her Imperious Condescension, the Empress of Alternia, who would make an attempt on her life if it weren't for her lusus' protection. She is fuchsia-blooded, the highest ranking blood caste, being that of royalty, but is shown to be much more passive than other high bloods, wanting to coddle low bloods rather than "cull" them, which is in some ways worse. Her astrological sign is Pisces. Her classpect is Witch of Life.

Dancestors

Carapacians
The Carapacians serve as NPCs to the game of Sburb.

Exiles

Dersite agents

Other characters
Other characters featured in Homestuck include the nearly-all-powerful antagonist Lord English, and a pair of "diametrically opposed twins living inside the same body" named Calliope and Caliborn. Andrew Hussie also inserted himself into Homestucks story as a character, where he offers detailed summaries and ends up in "bizarre in-world encounters." After Ryan North asked why "MS Paint Adventures" doesn't follow the adventures of a "Ms. Paint", Hussie included a minor Carapacian character to Homestuck with that name.

Late in the webcomic, Hussie introduced Davepetasprite^2, a fusion of the characters Davesprite (an apparitional alternate timeline version of Dave) and Nepeta Leijon. The character is notable for having a short-lived crisis regarding their gender identity, due to the differing genders of the sprite's two constituent characters. They eventually defined themself as non-binary. Many more sprites appear throughout the story, the most notable of which are Tavrisprite, Erisolsprite, and Jasprosesprite^2.

Analysis
According to Lilian Min of The Atlantic, Homestucks greatest strength is Andrew Hussie's "gift for character-building", and that the characters are unique and "strangely relatable". Elliott Dunstan of Monkeys Fighting Robots said, "the sheer number of characters and possible interactions can get overwhelming", and that each fan ends up with a favorite cast member. The characters of Homestuck are particularly popular among cosplayers, with cosplay events such as San Diegostuck being held for Homestuck cosplay specifically.

Mary Kinney of New York University wrote that Homestuck, which is heavily stylized as an adventure game, features an "implied character" as the player. This "nebulous" actor changes the Homestuck world. For example, on the first page of the webcomic, the player is prompted to enter the protagonist's name. After clicking to go to the following page, the reader's sense of control dissipates as they are not actually allowed to enter a name. The relationship between the player and the reader of the story fluctuates from page to page, and the player character may switch from avatar to avatar. In this way, the reader experiences Homestucks narrative through the experiences of various characters.

In an interview with The Daily Dot, Homestuck guest artist Shelby Cragg praised Hussie's webcomic for its 50:50 gender ratio and large number of well-written female characters. Creatrix Tiara of Autostraddle noted that Hussie was highly successful with creating a diverse LGBT cast, by writing the characters in a "realistic, non-fetishistic manner." A large number of LGBT readers have claimed to have been strongly affected by the representation of diverse sexualities and gender identities in the webcomic.

Characters and death
Characters frequently die within the plot of Homestuck, which Andrew Hussie described as a necessity of a story with such a large cast. Though Hussie used death as "the line between relevance and irrelevance", characters generally remain relevant in some way in the story, as there exist various video game-style constructs that allow a character to be revived. Rebecca Peterson of The Martlet described how "characters are gleefully killed off, brought back, and killed again" in a manner that makes it difficult to follow which characters are still alive. Characters may even have multiple versions of themselves active in the story simultaneously, both dead and alive. In an interview with Big Shiny Robot, Hussie said the following on this topic:

Death is presented as a "leveling up step" for the characters in Homestuck, it being the only way for characters to gain God Tier powers. According to Autostraddle, many characters reach a greater importance after their death, as they can contribute to the story as ghosts or helper sprites. Some readers of the webcomic see this implementation of death as a subversion of the "bury your gays" trope, as homosexual characters frequently get killed off in American media.

References
Homestuck

Sources

External links

MS Paint Adventures
Homestuck